This article presents a list of the historical events and publications of Australian literature during 1893.

Books 

 Carlton Dawe – The Emu's Head : A Chronicle of Dead Man's Flat
 E. W. Hornung – Tiny Luttrell
 Fergus Hume – The Harlequin Opal
 Rosa Praed
 Christina Chard: A Novel
 Outlaw and Lawmaker

Short stories 

 John Arthur Barry 
 "Number One North Rainbow"
 "Sojur Jim"
 Steve Brown's Bunyip and Other Stories 
 Louis Becke
 "Challis, the Doubter: The White Lady and the Brown Woman"
 "The Fate of the Alida"
 Ernest Favenc
 The Last of Six: Tales of the Austral Tropics
 "My Only Murder"
 Henry Lawson
 "A Camp-Fire Yarn"
 "A Love Story"
 "The Man Who Forgot"
 "On the Edge of a Plain"
 "The Union Buries Its Dead"

Poetry 

 Randolph Bedford – "The Days of '84"
 Ruth M. Bedford – Rhymes by Ruth
 E. J. Brady – "Laying on the Screw : The Other Side of the Wool-Trade"
 Edward Dyson – "When the Bell Blew Up"
 G. Herbert Gibson – Ironbark Chips and Stockwhip Cracks
 Henry Lawson
 "The Great Grey Plain"
 "Out Back"
 Louisa Lawson – "To My Sister"
 Louise Mack – "Manly Lagoon"
 Breaker Morant – "Since the Country Carried Sheep"
 A. B. Paterson
 "Black Swans"
 "A Bush Christening"
 "The Geebung Polo Club"
 Robert Richardson – Willow and Wattle : Poems

Births 

A list, ordered by date of birth (and, if the date is either unspecified or repeated, ordered alphabetically by surname) of births in 1893 of Australian literary figures, authors of written works or literature-related individuals follows, including year of death.

 15 May – Myra Morris, poet and novelist (died 1966)
 10 June – Martin Boyd, novelist (died 1972)
 23 June – Frank Dalby Davison, novelist (died 1970)

Deaths 

A list, ordered by date of death (and, if the date is either unspecified or repeated, ordered alphabetically by surname) of deaths in 1893 of Australian literary figures, authors of written works or literature-related individuals follows, including year of birth.

 19 May – Henry Halloran, poet (born 1811)
 4 September – Francis William Adams, novelist (born 1862)

See also 
 1893 in poetry
 List of years in literature
 List of years in Australian literature
 1893 in literature
 1892 in Australian literature
 1893 in Australia
 1894 in Australian literature

References

Literature
Australian literature by year
19th-century Australian literature
1893 in literature